Phosphate conversion coating is a chemical treatment applied to steel parts that creates a thin adhering layer of iron, zinc, or manganese phosphates, to achieve corrosion resistance, lubrication, or as a foundation for subsequent coatings or painting. It is one of the most common types of conversion coating. The  process is also called phosphate coating, phosphatization, phosphatizing, or phosphating.  It is also known by the trade name Parkerizing, especially when applied to firearms and other military equipment.

A phosphate coating is usually obtained by applying to the steel part a dilute solution of phosphoric acid, possibly with soluble iron, zinc, and/or manganese salts.  The solution may be applied by sponging, spraying, or immersion.
Phosphate conversion coatings can also be used on aluminium, zinc, cadmium, silver and tin.

Types

The main types of phosphate coatings are manganese, iron, and zinc.

 Manganese phosphate coatings are used both for corrosion resistance and lubricity and are applied only by immersion. 
 Iron phosphate coatings are typically used as a base for further coatings or painting and are applied by immersion or by spraying. 
 Zinc phosphate coatings are used for corrosion resistance, as a lubricant-holding layer, and as a paint/coating base and can also be applied by immersion or spraying. They can also be applied to galvanized steel.

Process
The process takes advantage of the low solubility of phosphates at medium or high pH. The bath is a solution of phosphoric acid, containing the desired iron, zinc or manganese cations and other additives. The acid reacts with the iron metal producing hydrogen and iron cations:
 Fe + 2  →   +  + 2 
The reaction consuming protons raises the pH of the solution in the immediate vicinity of the surface, until eventually the phosphates become insoluble and get deposited over it. The acid and metal reaction also creates iron phosphate locally which may also be deposited. When depositing zinc phosphate or manganese phosphate the additional iron phosphate may be an undesired impurity.

The bath often includes an oxidizer, such as sodium nitrite, to consume the hydrogen gas — which otherwise would form a layer of tiny bubbles over the surface, slowing down the reaction.

The main phosphating step can be preceded by an "activation" bath that creates tiny particles of titanium compounds on the surface.

The performance of a phosphate coating depends on its crystal structure as well as its thickness. A dense microcrystalline structure with a low porosity is usually best for corrosion resistance or subsequent painting. A coarse grain structure impregnated with oil may be best for wear resistance. These factors can be controlled by varying the bath concentration, composition, temperature, and time.

Parkerizing

Parkerizing is a method of protecting a steel surface from corrosion and increasing its resistance to wear through the application of a chemical phosphate conversion coating. Parkerizing is usually considered to be an improved zinc or manganese phosphating process, and not to be an improved iron phosphating process, although some use the term parkerizing as a generic term for applying phosphating (or phosphatizing) coatings that does include the iron phosphating process.  Bonderizing, phosphating, and phosphatizing are other terms associated with the Parkerizing process. It has also been known as pickling in the context of wrought iron and steel.

Parkerizing is commonly used on firearms as a more effective alternative to bluing, which is an earlier-developed chemical conversion coating. It is also used extensively on automobiles to protect unfinished metal parts from corrosion.

The Parkerizing process cannot be used on non-ferrous metals such as aluminium, brass, or copper. It similarly cannot be applied to steels containing a large amount of nickel, or on stainless steel. Passivation can be used for protecting other metals.

Early history 
Development of the process was started in England and continued by the Parker family in the United States.  The terms Parkerizing, Parkerize, and Parkerized are all technically registered U.S. trademarks of Henkel Adhesives Technologies, although the terminology has largely passed into generic use for many years. The process was first used on a large scale in the manufacture of firearms for the United States military during World War II.

The earliest work on phosphating processes was developed by British inventors William Alexander Ross, British patent 3119, in 1869, and by Thomas Watts Coslett, British patent 8667, in 1906. Coslett, of Birmingham, England, subsequently filed a patent based on this same process in America in 1907, which was granted  in 1907. It essentially provided an iron phosphating process, using phosphoric acid.

Clark W. Parker acquired the rights to Coslett's and Richards' U.S. patents, and experimented in the family kitchen with these and other rust-resisting formulations.  The ultimate result was that Clark W. Parker, along with his son Wyman C. Parker, working together, set up the Parker Rust-Proof Phosphating Company of America in 1915.

R. D. Colquhoun of the Parker Rust-Proof Phosphating Company of America then filed another improved phosphating patent application in 1919.

Manganese phosphating, even with these process improvements, still required the use of expensive and difficult-to-obtain manganese compounds. Subsequently, an alternative technique was developed by the Parker Company to use easier-to-obtain compounds at less expense through using zinc phosphating  in place of manganese phosphating.

Somewhat analogous to the improved manganese phosphating process improvements discovered by Baker and Dingman, a similarly improved method was found for an improved zinc phosphating process as well. This improvement was discovered by Darsey of the Parker Rust Proof Company, who filed a patent in February 1941, which was granted in August 1942, that improved upon the zinc phosphatizing (Parkerizing) process further. With these process improvements, the end result was that a low-temperature (energy-efficient) zinc phosphating (Parkerizing) process, using strategic materials to which the United States had ready access, became the most common phosphating process used during World War II to protect American war materials such as firearms and planes from rust and corrosion.

Later developments 

Glock Ges.m.b.H., an Austrian firearms manufacturer, uses a black Parkerizing process as a topcoat to a Tenifer process to protect the slides of the pistols they manufacture.  After applying the Tenifer process, a black Parkerized finish is applied and the slide is protected even if the Parkerized finish were to wear off. Used this way, Parkerizing is thus becoming a protective and decorative finishing technique that is used over other underlying improved techniques of metal protection.

Traditional iron phosphate, zinc phosphate, and manganese phosphate chemical conversion coatings, including Parkerizing variations, have all been criticized in recent years for introducing phosphates into surface water systems, encouraging the rapid growth of algae (eutrophication).  As a result, in recent years, new, emerging technology alternatives to traditional phosphate coatings have started to see limited use, for replacing all phosphating coatings, including Parkerizing.  The majority of these newer conversion coatings are fluorozirconium-based. The most popular of these fluorozirconium-based conversion coatings, introduced in 2005, incorporates the transition metal vanadium. This new, more environmentally friendly coating is referred to as a vanadate conversion coating.  Besides vanadate coatings, arsenate coatings may theoretically provide similar protection, at the risk of being a health hazard to humans and animals. It remains to be seen if these, or other new chemical conversion coatings, will ultimately replace traditional phosphating and Parkerizing.

Various of similar recipes for stovetop kitchen Parkerizing circulate in gun publications at times, and Parkerizing kits are sold by major gun-parts distributors such as Brownells.

Uses

Painting primer
Phosphate coatings are also commonly used as an effective surface preparation for further coating and/or painting, providing excellent adhesion and electric isolation.

Corrosion resistance
Phosphate coatings are often used to protect steel parts against rusting and other types of corrosion.  However, they are somewhat porous, so this use requires impregnating the coating with oil, paint, or some other sealing substance. The result is a tightly adhering dielectric (electrically insulating) layer that can protect the part from electrochemical and under-paint corrosion.

Wear resistance
Zinc and manganese coatings are used to help break in components subject to wear and help prevent galling.

Lubrication
While a zinc phosphate coating by itself is somewhat abrasive, it can be turned into a lubricating layer for cold forming operations by treatment with sodium stearate (soap). The soap reacts with the phosphate crystals forming a very thin insoluble and hydrophobic zinc stearate layer, that helps to hold the unreacted sodium stearate even under extreme deformation of the part, such as in wire drawing.

See also
Chromate conversion coating
Iron pillar of Delhi

References
<references>

<ref name=skar1997>J. Skar, M. Walter, and D. Albright (1997): "Non-Chromate Conversion Coatings for Magnesium Die Castings". '',  https://www.sae.org/publications/technical-papers/content/970324/  DOI: https://doi.org/10.4271/970324
Citation: Skar, J., Walter, M., and Albright, D., "," SAE International, Technical Paper 970324 </ref>

</references>

Sources
 MIL-HDBK-205, Phosphate & Black Oxide Coating of Ferrous Metals'': a standard overview on phosphate and black oxide (bluing) coatings
 
 .

External links 
 Henkel Surface Technologies—Current owner of Parco-Lubrite (a manganese phosphating process) and other Parkerizing rust-prevention coatings. (Parco is a registered trademark of Henkel Surface Technologies.)
 Coral Chemical Company—Current owner of Coral Eco Treat (vanadium conversion coating process)
 Parker Rust-Proof of Cleveland—Last remaining of the four original job shop licensees of Parker Chemical, currently offers phosphating services

Coatings
Corrosion prevention